Priiskovy (masculine), Priiskovaya (feminine), or Priiskovoye (neuter) is the name of several inhabited localities in Russia.

Urban localities
Priiskovy, Zabaykalsky Krai, an urban-type settlement in Nerchinsky District of Zabaykalsky Krai

Rural localities
Priiskovy, Sverdlovsk Oblast, a settlement under the administrative jurisdiction of the City of Yekaterinburg in Sverdlovsk Oblast
Priiskovoye, a selo in Priiskovy Selsoviet of Ordzhonikidzevsky District of the Republic of Khakassia